Cathedral of the Rockies, also known as the Cathedral of the Rockies First United Methodist Church, is a United Methodist church located in the historic North End district of Boise, Idaho, United States. The church is the largest United Methodist Church in Boise, Idaho, the largest in the Oregon-Idaho Conference of the United Methodist denomination, and was the first Methodist church in Boise, founded in 1872.

The present building was constructed 1958-1960 under the leadership of the Rev. Dr. Herbert E. Richards, and covers an entire city block. The stained glass is a notable and unique feature, depicting Biblical history as well as themes of the history of Christianity and aspects of American history including local references to Idaho and the city of Boise. The church is popular as a visitor destination, and attracts worshipers from all over America and the world. This is the third building to be used by the congregation. The original 1872 church was located at 8th and Bannock streets, site of the present Hoff Building (old Hotel Boise), near the Idaho State Capitol building. In about 1903–05, a new church was constructed at 10th and State streets (where the YMCA building is now located).

The new Cathedral of the Rockies structure was consecrated in December 1960, with a series of impressive ceremonies. During the year 2010, a number of church events are being held to commemorate the opening of the new church. In 2002 the structure was extensively expanded under the leadership of the Rev. Dr. Steve Tollefson. The new Emmaus Center was designed for contemporary worship and other social events; and more classroom and office space was also added, considerably enhancing the facilities.

In 1984, the cathedral served as the location for Senator Frank Church's funeral.

In June 2020, the church announced that it would remove its stained-glass window featuring Confederate general Robert E. Lee. The image had been under discussion since 2015 and a decision was made following the murder of George Floyd.

The ministries of the Cathedral of the Rockies are extensive, involving many services to the surrounding community. Educational ministries are available to children, youth, and adults. A full-time children's center and pre-school operates year-round. Many small groups are offered, and ministries are offered to the homeless and needy.

References

External links

Gothic Revival church buildings in Idaho
Churches in Boise, Idaho
United Methodist churches in Idaho
Religious organizations established in 1872
19th-century Methodist church buildings
Methodist cathedrals in the United States
1872 establishments in Idaho Territory
Harold E. Wagoner buildings